Tacune (possibly from Aymara taku Prosopis (genus of South American tree) / colored medicinal earth, -ni a suffix to indicate ownership, "the one with the taku tree" or "the one with medicinal earth") is a mountain in the Andes of Peru, about  high. It is situated south of Lake Salinas and east of the mountain Pichu Pichu. Tacune is located in the Arequipa Region, Arequipa Province, Tarucani District, and in the Moquegua Region, General Sánchez Cerro Province, Puquina District.

Tacune is also the name of an intermittent stream which flows from the mountain towards Lake Salinas.

See also 
 Pachakutiq
 Qillqata

References

Mountains of Peru
Mountains of Arequipa Region
Mountains of Moquegua Region